USNS Charles Drew (T-AKE-10) is a Lewis and Clark-class dry cargo ship of the United States Navy, named in honor of Dr. Charles R. Drew (1904–1950), who developed improved techniques for blood storage, and applied his expert knowledge in developing large-scale blood banks early in World War II, saving thousands of Allied lives.

The contract to build Charles Drew was awarded to National Steel and Shipbuilding Company (NASSCO) of San Diego, California, on 31 January 2008. 
Her keel was laid down on 17 March 2009. 
Charles Drew was christened and launched on 27 February 2010, sponsored by Mrs. Bebe Drew Price, the eldest daughter of Dr. Drew. The principal address at the ceremony was given by Vice Admiral Regina Benjamin, the Surgeon General of the United States.

Charles Drew was delivered to Military Sealift Command on 14 July 2010 and began conducting missions for MSC in spring 2011 and will operate in the Pacific.

References

External links

marinetraffic.com

 https://www.nassco.com/pdfs/T-AKE-10_Program.pdf

Lewis and Clark-class dry cargo ships
Ships built in San Diego
2010 ships